The 2019 CRO Race is a road cycling stage race that took place in Croatia between 1 and 6 October 2019. It is the fifth edition of the race through Croatia organized by Top Sport Event company, but first under new name and logo. The race is rated as a 2.1 event as part of the 2019 UCI Europe Tour.

Teams
Eighteen teams were invited to start the race. These included four UCI WorldTeams, five UCI Professional Continental teams and nine UCI Continental teams.

UCI WorldTeams

 
 
 
 

UCI Professional Continental Teams

 
 
 
 
 

UCI Continental Teams

 
 
 
 
 P&S Metalltechnik

Schedule

Stages

Stage 1
1 October 2019 — Osijek to Lipik,

Stage 2
2 October 2019 — Slunj to Zadar,

Stage 3
3 October 2019 — Okrug to Makarska,

Stage 4
4 October 2019 — Starigrad to Crikvenica,

Stage 5
5 October 2019 — Rabac to Platak,

Stage 6
6 October 2019 — Sveta Nedelja to Zagreb,

Classification leadership table

Classification standings

General classification

Points classification

Mountains classification

Young rider classification

Team classification

References

CRO Race
CRO Race
Tour of Croatia